Reasonable Doubt is an American streaming legal drama television series created by Raamla Mohamed for Hulu. The series stars Emayatzy Corinealdi as a corporate defense lawyer navigating challenging high-profile cases. The series also stars McKinley Freeman, Tim Jo, Angela Grovey, Thaddeus J. Mixson, Aderinsola Olabode, and Michael Ealy. It premiered on September 27, 2022.

Plot 
Jax Stewart is a successful defense lawyer at an up-scale Los Angeles law firm. She navigates difficult cases amid a separation from her husband and the reappearance of a former client she worked with in her previous job as a public defender.

Cast 
 Emayatzy Corinealdi as Jacqueline "Jax" Stewart (née Nicholas), a defense lawyer, mother to two children, and wife currently separated from her husband, Lewis
 McKinley Freeman as Lewis, Jax's husband
 Tim Jo as Daniel, Jax's investigator
 Christopher Cassarino as Rich Reed, a colleague of Jax's
 Angela Grovey as Krystal Walters
 Aderinsola Olabode as Naima, Jax's tween daughter
 Michael Ealy as Damon Cooke, a previous client of Jax's recently released from prison
 Thaddeus J. Mixson as Spenser, Jax's teenage son
 Sean Patrick Thomas as Brayden Miller, a billionaire and new client of Jax's
 Perri Camper as Kaleesha Moore, a murder victim who accused Brayden Miller of sexual assault
 Tiffany Yvonne Cox, Nefetari Spencer, and Shannon Kane as Autumn, Sally, and Shanelle, Jax's closest friends

Episodes

Production 
The series was created by Raamla Mohamed, a former Scandal writer. It is loosely based on the experiences of celebrity attorney Shawn Holley, who is also a producer for the show. Kerry Washington directed the series pilot.

Reasonable Doubt was produced through the Walt Disney Television's Onyx Collective. The show premiered on September 27, 2022, on Hulu. The season has nine episodes.

Critical reception 
Reasonable Doubt received positive critical reception. It holds a 100% on Rotten Tomatoes with an average rating of 7.8/10 based on seven critic reviews. In a mainly positive review Daniel D'Addario described the series in Variety: "“Reasonable Doubt” plays like the juicy soap Shonda Rhimes would never write; its excesses, often, grab and hold our attention." Kristen Baldwin rated the show a B+ in EW and stated, "Reasonable Doubt is enjoyably Shonda-esque, in that it's a steamy, speed-plotted soap built around a morally ambiguous female power player whose life is filled with ridiculously attractive men. But Mohamed also weaves in frank and nuanced stories about marriage, parenting, and the importance of (and challenges with) female friendships." The Hollywood Reporter's Angie Han praised the lead actress's performance, "Corinealdi is lots of fun to watch as Jax, and she’s blessed with scripts that allow her to embody multitudes. Depending on the scene, Jax can be prickly or tender, sensuous or funny, and Corinealdi plays all her many facets with equal gusto. She’s also, importantly, able to generate chemistry with seemingly everyone in the ensemble."

References

External links 
 Official website
 

2022 American television series debuts
2020s American black television series
2020s American drama television series
2020s American legal television series
American legal drama television series
English-language television shows
Television shows set in Los Angeles
Television series by ABC Studios
African-American television
Hulu original programming
Onyx Collective original programming